Svatopluk Bouška (born 29 April 1947) is a former football player and manager. He had 164 appearances in the Czechoslovak First League and scored four goals. He represented his country at youth level. Moreover, Bouška became the third manager of Dukla Prague in the 1993–94 season, in which the club finished last. He managed Bohemians Prague in the 1994–95 season. His older brother, Josef Bouška, also played over 100 times in the Czechoslovak First League.

References 

1947 births
Living people
Czech footballers
Czechoslovak footballers
Association football midfielders
AC Sparta Prague players
Bohemians 1905 players
Czech football managers
Czechoslovak football managers
Czech First League managers
Dukla Prague managers
Bohemians 1905 managers